Laval-des-Rapides is a district in Laval, Quebec, Canada. It was a separate city until the municipal mergers on August 6, 1965.

Geography 
The neighbourhood is delimited on the north, north-west and west by Chomedey, on the east and north-east by Pont-Viau and on the south by the Rivière des Prairies.

Education
Commission scolaire de Laval operates French-language public schools.
 Écoles secondaire de la Mosaïque
 Écoles secondaire Mont-de-La Salle
 École primaire De l’Arc-en-ciel
 École primaire Léon-Guilbault
 École primaire Marcel-Vaillancourt
 École primaire Sainte-Marguerite

Sir Wilfrid Laurier School Board operates English-language public schools.
All sections of Laval are zoned to Laval Junior Academy and Laval Senior Academy.

References

External links
City of Laval, official website

Neighbourhoods in Laval, Quebec
Former municipalities in Quebec
Populated places disestablished in 1965
Canada geography articles needing translation from French Wikipedia